Jenna Carroll Richmond (born December 18, 1991) is an American soccer midfielder who last played for FC Kansas City in the National Women's Soccer League.

Early life
Born in Alexandria, Virginia, Richmond attended Centreville High School in Clifton, Virginia where she played soccer and ran cross country. Playing for two club soccer teams, GSC Team America Premier and McLean Freedom, she won six State Cup titles and won a national championship at the U-16 level. She received Golden Boot honors at the national championship as the tournament's top goal scorer.

In 2009 and 2010, Richmond was named Gatorade Player of the Year for Virginia as well as Parade All-American. In 2010, she was also named Washington Post Player of the Year. During her senior year in high school, she was named the top college recruit according to multiple sources, including ESPN and Top Drawer Soccer.

UCLA Bruins

Won the 2013 NCAA Division I Women's Soccer Championship with UCLA in her senior year.

Playing career

Club

FC Kansas City
Richmond was drafted by FC Kansas City as the sixteenth overall pick of the 2014 NWSL College Draft.

International
Richmond has represented the United States on the U-15, U-17, U-20, and U-23 teams.

Honors and awards

Team
with FC Kansas City:
 NWSL championship: 2014

References

External links
 US Soccer player profile
 UCLA player profile
 FC Kansas City player profile

1991 births
Living people
Soccer players from Virginia
American women's soccer players
Sportspeople from Virginia
National Women's Soccer League players
FC Kansas City players
UCLA Bruins women's soccer players
Women's association football midfielders
FC Kansas City draft picks
United States women's under-20 international soccer players
People from Alexandria, Virginia